WVCX is a Christian radio station licensed to Tomah, Wisconsin, broadcasting on 98.9 MHz FM.  WVCX is also heard on translators W216BL 91.1 in McFarland, Wisconsin; covering the Madison area, K208FO 89.5 in Prairie du Chien, Wisconsin, and W275CH 102.9 in Ripon, Wisconsin.  The station is owned by VCY America.

Programming
WVCX's programming includes Christian Talk and Teaching programming including; Crosstalk, Worldview Weekend with Brannon Howse, Grace to You with John MacArthur, In Touch with Dr. Charles Stanley, Love Worth Finding with Adrian Rogers, Revive Our Hearts with Nancy Leigh DeMoss, The Alternative with Tony Evans, Liberty Council's Faith and Freedom Report, Thru the Bible with J. Vernon McGee, Joni and Friends, Unshackled!, and Moody Radio's Stories of Great Christians.

WVCX also airs a variety of vocal and instrumental traditional Christian Music, as well as children's programming such as Ranger Bill.

History
The station began broadcasting on January 29, 1965, holding the call sign WTMB-FM. It was owned by The Tomah-Mauston Broadcasting Company. In the 1960s, it simulcast the AM 1460 WTMB from dawn until 2 p.m. It broadcast in FM stereo, airing an easy listening format, and was the largest easy listening FM station in Wisconsin. In the 1970s, the station aired a MOR format, as a partial simulcast with 1460 WTMB. In the early 1980s, its simulcast ended, and it aired MOR music, talk, and farm programming independently.

In 1984, the station was sold to Wisconsin Voice of Christian Youth for $465,000. It adopted its current Christian format, and its call sign was changed to WVCX.

Translators

See also
 Vic Eliason

References

External links
 VCY America official website
 

VCX
Radio stations established in 1965
1965 establishments in Wisconsin
VCY America stations